CWT (formerly Carlson Wagonlit Travel) is a travel management company that manages business travel, meetings, incentives, conferencing, exhibitions, and handles event management.

Headquartered in Minneapolis, Minnesota, the company reported US$23 billion in total transaction volume in 2018. It is ranked 5th on the list of top earning travel companies published by Travel Weekly.

History
CWT has existed in its present form since 1994, the result of a 50%/50% merger of two large travel agencies: the Ask Mr. Foster Travel Agency chain, later called Carlson Travel Network, and the travel agency of Compagnie Internationale des Wagons-Lits (literally sleeping car), founded by Georges Nagelmackers in 1872 in Belgium and later acquired by Accor.

On April 27, 2006, Accor announced the sale of its 50% interest in CWT: 5% to Carlson and 45% to One Equity Partners, an affiliate of JP Morgan Chase.

On June 22, 2014, Carlson, which owned a 55% stake in CWT, agreed to acquire the 45% interest in CWT held by JPMorgan Chase.

In July 2017, the company launched RoomIt by CWT, dedicated to hotel distribution.

On February 18, 2019, the company announced that it was rebranding as CWT.

On July 31, 2020, the Register reported that CWT was the victim of a ransomware incident a week earlier, in which they paid US$4.5 million.

References

External links
 

Travel and holiday companies of the United States
Privately held companies based in Minnesota
Travel management
Carlson (company)
Hospitality companies established in 1994
American companies established in 1994
Companies that filed for Chapter 11 bankruptcy in 2021